Nothing More Than a Woman (Spanish: Nada más que una mujer) is a 1934 American drama film directed by Harry Lachman and starring Berta Singerman, Alfredo del Diestro and Juan Torena. It is the Spanish-language version of Fox's Pursued (1934).

Cast
 Berta Singerman as Mona Estrada  
 Alfredo del Diestro as Julio Franchoni  
 Juan Torena as David Landeen  
 Luana Alcañiz as Gilda  
 Lucio Villegas as Doctor Steiner  
 Carmen Rodríguez as Madame Lascar  
 Julian Rivero as Hansen  
 Frazer Acosta as Ali  
 Juan Ola as Native  
 James Dime as Native

References

Bibliography
 Jarvinen, Lisa. The Rise of Spanish-language Filmmaking: Out from Hollywood's Shadow, 1929-1939. Rutger's University Press, 2012.

External links
 

1934 films
1934 drama films
1930s Spanish-language films
Spanish-language American films
American drama films
Films directed by Harry Lachman
20th Century Fox films
American black-and-white films
Films scored by Samuel Kaylin
1930s American films